Vilnius City Municipality Building is located on Konstitucijos Avenue, Vilnius. The building was completed and opened in 2004. In the past, Municipal Departments and Divisions were scattered throughout the capital. Now they are concentrated in the new center of the Municipality, which has improved the service of the city residents and the working conditions of the municipal employees.

References

Buildings and structures in Vilnius
Legislative buildings in Europe